STTD may refer to:
Space–time block coding based transmit diversity, a method of transmit diversity used in UMTS third-generation cellular systems
Spacetime triangle diagram technique, a special time-domain technique for wave motion